Jean Carlo Witte (born 24 September 1977 in Blumenau, Santa Catarina) is a Brazilian football (soccer) defender.

He played for Santos and Brazilian U-20 team at 1997 FIFA World Youth Championship.

Club statistics

Honors

Team
J.League Cup Champions : 2004

References

External links

Brazilian FA archive  
fctokyo.co.jp

1977 births
Living people
Brazilian footballers
Brazilian expatriate footballers
Santos FC players
Esporte Clube Bahia players
FC Tokyo players
Shonan Bellmare players
J1 League players
J2 League players
Expatriate footballers in Japan
Association football defenders
Brazilian people of German descent
Brazil under-20 international footballers
Brazil international footballers
People from Blumenau
Sportspeople from Santa Catarina (state)